Bruce J. Caldwell (born 1952) is an American historian of economics, Research Professor of Economics at Duke University, and Director of the Center for the History of Political Economy. Prior to holding this position, Caldwell was the Joe Rosenthal Excellence Professor of Economics at the University of North Carolina at Greensboro.  In 1979, he received his Ph.D. in Economics from the University of North Carolina at Chapel Hill and did post-doctoral work at New York University, where he was influenced by both Ludwig Lachmann and Israel Kirzner.

He is the General Editor of the University of Chicago's The Collected Works of F.A. Hayek. He is the third editor of the series, after W.W. Bartley III and Stephen Kresge. In particular, Caldwell edited The Road to Serfdom: Text and Documents –The Definitive Edition.

He is the author of Beyond Positivism: Economic Methodology in the 20th Century, first published in 1982. For the past two decades his research has focused on the multi-faceted writings of the Nobel Prize-winning economist and social theorist Friedrich A. Hayek. Caldwell's intellectual biography of Hayek, Hayek's Challenge, was published in 2004 by the University of Chicago Press. Formerly at the University of North Carolina at Greensboro, Caldwell has also held research fellowships at New York University, Cambridge University, and the London School of Economics. He is a past president of the History of Economics Society, a past Executive Director of the International Network for Economic Method, and a Life Member of Clare Hall, Cambridge.

Caldwell's book Hayek's Challenge: An Intellectual Biography of F.A. Hayek, was published by the University of Chicago Press in 2004, and reviewed by a number of journals.
He has also published a number of scholarly articles on this and related subjects.

References

External links

 Home page
 
 
 

Austrian School economists
Economic historians
Historians of economic thought
Living people
Duke University faculty
1952 births